Michael or Mike Bell may refer to:

Politics
Michael Bell (Irish politician) (1936–2011), former Irish Labour Party politician
Michael Bell (mayor) (born 1955), mayor of Toledo, Ohio
Michael Dougall Bell (1943–2017), Canadian diplomat
Michael Richard Bell, Canadian diplomat
Mike Bell (politician) (born 1963), Republican member of the Tennessee Senate

Sports

Baseball
Mike Bell (third baseman) (1974–2021), American baseball player and coach
Mike Bell (first baseman) (born 1968), American baseball player formerly of Atlanta Braves
Mike Bell (baseball coach) (born 1972), American college baseball coach and former pitcher

Other sports
Micky Bell (born 1971), English football defender
Michael Bell (racehorse trainer) (born 1960), British racehorse trainer
Michael Bell (cricketer) (born 1966), English cricketer
Mike Bell (running back) (born 1983), American football player for Cleveland Browns
Mike Bell (defensive lineman) (born 1957), former American football player for Kansas City Chiefs
Mike Bell (bridge) (born 1984), English bridge player
Mike Bell (wrestler) (1971–2008), American pro wrestler
Mike Bell (basketball) (born 1982), American basketball player
Mike Bell (motorcyclist) (1957–2021), American motorcycle racer

Others
Michael Bell (actor) (born 1938), American actor and voice actor
Michael Bell (artist) (born 1971), American artist
Michael Mayerfeld Bell (born 1957), American sociologist and social theorist
Michael Bell, original author of Integrated workplace management system (IWMS) software
Michael B. T. Bell (born 1957), American enterprise software architect
Michael Bell, Australian producer, part of Safia (band)